Snowboarding at the 2012 Winter Youth Olympics was held at the Nordkette Innsbruck and Kuhtai in Igls, Innsbruck, Austria from 16 to 19 January.

Medal summary

Medal table

Boys' Events

Girls' Events

Qualification System

References

 
2012 in snowboarding
2012 Winter Youth Olympics events
2012